Deodato may refer to:
 Eumir Deodato (born 1942), Brazilian crossover music pianist, composer, arranger, and record producer
 Cláudio Deodato (1947 - 2011), Brazilian footballer
 Deodato Arellano (1844 – 1899), propagandist and first president of the Katipunan Philippine revolutionary society
 Deodato Bocconi (died 1477), Roman Catholic prelate who served as Bishop of Ajaccio
 Deodato Cosmati (1225-1303), one of the Cosmati family of Roman sculptor-architects and mosaicists
 Deodato Guinaccia (c. 1510 – 1585), Italian painter of the Renaissance period
 Deodato Orlandi (died before 1331), Italian painter who worked in Lucca and Pisa
 Mike Deodato (born 1963), pseudonym of Brazilian comic book artist Deodato Taumaturgo Borges Filho
 Ruggero Deodato (1939 - 2022), Italian film director,
 Deodato 2, a 1973 album by Brazilian keyboardist Eumir Deodato

See also
 Deodat, a similar name
 Diodato, Italian pop singer